James Francis Warner (born March 26, 1954 in Saint Paul, Minnesota) is an American retired professional ice hockey forward who played 32 National Hockey League regular season games with the Hartford Whalers in 1979–80. Warner was originally drafted by the New York Rangers in the 1974 NHL amateur draft but he chose instead to sign a free agent contract with the New England Whalers of the rival World Hockey Association in 1978. He appeared in 41 WHA regular season games with the Whalers in 1978–79 and was retained by the club when the NHL and WHA merged in 1979.

Before turning professional, Warner played for the Colorado College men's ice hockey team. He was also a member of the American national team at the 1975, 1976 and 1978 World Championships.

Career statistics

Regular season and playoffs

International

Awards and honors

References

External links

Jim Warner @ hockeydraftcentral.com

1954 births
Living people
American men's ice hockey right wingers
Colorado College Tigers men's ice hockey players
Hartford Whalers players
Ice hockey people from Saint Paul, Minnesota
New England Whalers players
New York Rangers draft picks
Springfield Indians players